Pointe-Noire is an unincorporated community in the Canadian province of Quebec.  It is within the city
of Sept-Îles in the Sept-Rivières regional county municipality and the Côte-Nord region of eastern Quebec.
 
It is a shipping port and a terminal of the Chemin de fer Arnaud railway.

References 

Neighbourhoods in Sept-Îles, Quebec